My Thoughts Are Silent is a Ukrainian comedy-drama film by director Antonio Lukich. The film was first shown on July 4, 2019, during the East of West (Karlovy Vary) section of the 54th Karlovy Vary International Film Festival, where it won the Special Jury Prize.

The film was released in Ukraine on January 16, 2020. For seven weeks in the box office box office receipts amounted to more than 10 million UAH. It ranks 20th in the list of the 100 best films in the history of Ukrainian cinema.

Plot 
The film examines the eternal problem of parents and children. The protagonist works as a sound engineer and musician, encounters a lot of problems and has many setbacks. The same crisis awaits him in his personal life. A Canadian company invites him to record the sounds of Ukrainian animals in Transcarpathia. He fulfills the assignment with enthusiasm and creativity, but his mother comes along and constantly disturbs and distracts him. If he manages to record the voice of a rare Rakhiv mallard, he may be able to leave "uncomfortable Ukraine" and travel to "attractive Canada."

Cast 

 Andriy Lidahovskiy  — Vadim, sound engineer
 Irma Vitovska-Vantsa — Vadim's mom, taxi driver in Uzhhorod

Production

Estimate 
In June 2017, the film was one of the winners of the 10th Derzhkino Competition. The film received state funding of UAH 8.9 million UAH out of a total estimate of UAH 9.2 million UAH. Filming began in Ukraine in March 2018. Filming took place in Kyiv, in the Carpathians Mountains, and in the Zakarpattia Oblast.

Music 
Most of the money was spent on music. For almost 10 thousand dollars. The authors of the film acquired the rights to the song Spice Girls Viva Forever. The song became the most expensive item of expenses not by chance, because the main character wants to live like Victoria Beckham, because she is in love with her. Because of this, her song was identified as the key in the tape. For this purpose, the female ensemble of the chamber choir “Inspiratum” of the Procathedral Cathedral of St. Alexander, which is located in Kyiv on Kostyolnaya Street, recorded a version for the film.

Release

Festival release 
The film was first shown on July 4, 2019 at the East of West section of the 54th Karlovy Vary International Film Festival. There, the movie "My Thoughts Are Silent" received a Special Jury Award. In Ukraine, the premiere of the film took place during the Odesa International Film Festival, where Antonio Lukich's work received the Audience Award, the FIPRESCI Award for Best Ukrainian Film, the Award for Best Actor (Irma VItovska-Vantsa).

Movie release 
The movie rental in Ukraine took place on January 16, 2020. The distributor made a re-release of the tape on March 5, 2020 in Ukraine on the occasion of International Women's Day.

Box office 
The movie was released in Ukraine in 91 cinemas and for the first week from January 16 to January 22, 2020 the comedy was watched by 29 thousand viewers and the fees amounted to almost 2.8 million UAH.  In the second week film release reduced to 74 cinemas  and at the end of the second week, the total number of movie views was 52.3 thousand viewers, and the total box office was  5.0 million UAH. Though the film earned more than ₴ 9.4 million at the box office in Ukraine.

References

External links 
 
 
 My Thoughts Are Silent on the website of the Ukrainian distributor Arthouse Traffic

2019 films
Ukrainian comedy-drama films
Ukrainian-language films
Films set in Ukraine
Films shot in Ukraine